This is a list of BioBlitzes that have been held in New Zealand. The date is the first day of the BioBlitz if held over several days. This list only includes those that were major public events. BioBlitz was established in New Zealand by Manaaki Whenua - Landcare Research initially based on seed funding from The Royal Society of NZ's "Science & Technology Promotion Fund 2003/2004". BioBlitz events have always been a collaborative activity of professional and amateur taxonomic experts from multiple organisations and the public. Auckland BioBlitz events were coordinated by Manaaki Whenua, later from 2015 moving to events coordinated by Auckland Museum. The first events were 24 hours continuously, e.g. from 3 pm Friday overnight to 3 pm Saturday. Subsequently, this changed to 24 hours spread across mostly daylight hours over 2 consecutive days. For a series of downloadable posters for BioBlitz see: . See also: .

References

Biological censuses